The Grand Council of Geneva is the legislature of the canton of Geneva, in Switzerland.  Geneva, styled as a 'Republic and Canton', has a unicameral legislature.  The Grand Council was established in its present form and with 100 seats in 1842, with members elected every four years. Its oldest ancestor is the Council of Two Hundred (with 200 seats), founded in 1526. Members of the canton's executive, the Conseil d'Etat, are elected a month later.

There is a 7% threshold that political parties wishing to be represented on the Grand Council must overcome. Seven parties did so at the most recent election, held on 15 April 2018.

In 2018, on a lower turnout compared with 2013, right-wing populists lost previous gains, with the traditionally dominant parties, the Liberals, the Social Democrats and the Greens, increasing their votes.

Secretary 
The office of the secretary of the Grand Council of Geneva is headed by the sautier; originally, the role of the sautier was military, and he was the head of the watch. Overtime, the function changed and the sautier became the permanent secretary of the Grand Council.

One of his duties include the regular observation of the Geneva official chestnut tree, and the recording of the date of the opening of the first leaf on an official register. This event is then announced to the press and to the general public, indicating the beginning of the Spring.

References

External links

 

1842 establishments in Europe
Cantonal legislatures of Switzerland
Politics of the canton of Geneva
Geneva